St. James Square may refer to:

 St. James Square Historic District, San Jose, California
 St. James Square, the historic campus of the Toronto Normal School, Ontario, Canada
 Sankt Jakobs Plads (St. James' Square), Copenhagen, Denmark
 St James's Square, London, England
 The original name of Telfair Square in Savannah, Georgia
 St James Square, Monmouth, Wales

See also
 St James Park (disambiguation)
 St James Quarter, Edinburgh, Scotland